The E96 cluster bomb was an American anti-personnel biological cluster bomb developed in 1950.

History
A February 24, 1950 report prepared by William M. Creasy, a colonel in the Army Chemical Corps' Research and Engineering Division, characterized the E96 cluster bomb as in the final stages of development. According to Creasy's report, at the time the U.S. had no other biological weapon systems ready for use in battle.

Specifications
The E96 cluster bomb was a  biological weapon designed to deliver an anti-personnel or anti-animal biological agent. It consisted of 104 E48 sub-munitions, each one weighing . The sub-munitions were clustered into an E38 cluster adapter and when used, would be dropped from  generating an aerosol cloud in the shape of an ellipse.

References

Biological weapon delivery systems
Cluster munition